Novice is the seventh studio album by French rocker Alain Bashung, issued in 1989 on Barclay Records.

Production 
The songwriting is split between Boris Bergman, marking is last collaboration with Bashung, and Jean Fauque who would go on to write his four subsequent albums. Bashung said about the album that it was a sequel of sort to his experiments on Play blessures. The album has a dark sound, and did not sell very well. One of the song, "By Proxy", is one of the very few original written entirely in English by Bashung.

The song "Alcaline" is a pun on French pop singer Christophe's song "Aline". In 2011, Christophe covered the song for the tribute album Tels Alain Bashung.

Reception 
In a review that was featured in the compilation OpticalSound 3, one reviewer praised Novice as the only Bashung album other than Play blessures that they enjoyed all the way through. Academic Jean Frédéric Hennuy compared the lyrics of "Pyromanes" and "Légère éclaircie" with those of Nick Cave.

Track listing

Bonus Track (1993 CD reissue)

Personnel

Musicians 
 Olivier Guindon - guitars
 Vic Emerson - keyboards
 Colin Newman - keyboards
 Philippe Draï - drums
 Dave Ball - keyboards
 Jean-Marie Aerts - guitars
 Blixa Bargeld - guitars
 Phil Manzanera - guitars
 Simon Rogers - guitars
 Mick Parker - guitars

Production 
 Realisation: Nick Patrick
 Mixing: Jean Trenchant and Nick Patrick
 Remix 1992 (12-13): Djoum
 Photographs: T.Rajic
 Graphism: Antonietti, Pascault & Associés
 Graphism: Huart/Cholley
 Editions: 1,2,3,4,6,8,11 & 12 Polygram Music/Pitchi-Poï; 5,7,9 & 10 Polygram Music

References

1989 albums
Barclay (record label) albums
Alain Bashung albums